Barchín del Hoyo is a municipality in Cuenca, Castile-La Mancha, Spain. It has a population of 123. The town was the subject of the song "Little Spanish Town," released by English musician Conor B in 2012.

References 

Municipalities in the Province of Cuenca